Robert Graf (November 18, 1923 – February 4, 1966) was a German actor who played the role of Werner, "The Ferret" in the 1963 movie The Great Escape. Graf was born in Witten, Germany in 1923. In 1942, after completing his Abitur, he was conscripted into the Wehrmacht and sent to the Eastern Front. He was wounded in 1944, and assigned to war production duties in Munich, where he began his study of theater. In 1952, Graf married the actress Selma Urfer and had three children. He was the father of the director Dominik Graf. Robert Graf died of cancer in Munich in 1966 at age 42.

Filmography

References

External links

 Robert Graf Bio on Filmportal.de

1923 births
1966 deaths
People from Witten
German male film actors
German male television actors
20th-century German male actors
Deaths from cancer in Germany
German Army personnel of World War II